Jimmie Smith  is an American politician and member of the Democratic Party who has served as the mayor of Meridian, Mississippi since 2021. Previously, he served 20 years on the Lauderdale County Board of Supervisors.

Early life
Smith was born in Chicago on June 29, 1952. As a teenager, he moved to Meridian.

Career
Shortly after his arrival in Meridian, Smith worked in area hospitals. Later, he joined the Meridian Police Department where he worked in various divisions including the SWAT Team.

Community involvement
Smith served for 20 years on the Lauderdale County Board of Supervisors.

Mayor of Meridian
In 2005, while still serving on the Board of Supervisors, Smith was the Democratic nominee for mayor. He lost to the incumbent John Robert Smith in the general election by only 104 votes.

Sixteen years later, Jimmie Smith faced off against Mayor Percy Bland in the Democratic primary. After, beating Bland in the April 2021 run-off, he faced city council member Weston Lindemann, an independent, and Republican Robert Ray in the general election. In June 2021, Smith won that race decisively with over 60 percent of the vote.

When he assumed office in July 2021, he became only the second African American mayor of Meridian, a town with a population that is over 60 percent Black.

References

1952 births
African-American mayors in Mississippi
Living people
Mayors of Meridian, Mississippi
Mississippi Democrats
Politicians from Chicago
21st-century African-American people
20th-century African-American people